The Nikon Coolpix P510 is an ultrazoom bridge camera announced by Nikon on February 1, 2012.

References
http://www.dpreview.com/products/nikon/compacts/nikon_cpp510/specifications

P510
Superzoom cameras
Cameras introduced in 2012